Tor Henning Hamre (born April 24, 1979) is a Norwegian former footballer who played as a striker.

In 2003, he scored an impressive 39 goals, which saw him win the Meistriliiga top scorer award, and even put him in contention for the ESM Golden Boot. He also scored in 15 consecutive games, tallying 21 goals in that streak, a record in world football before Lionel Messi surpassed him by netting in 21 straight league games during the 2013–14 season.

References

External links
 Tor Henning Hamre official page
 Player profile on Mandalskameratene

Norwegian footballers
Mandalskameratene players
Vålerenga Fotball players
FC Flora players
Herfølge Boldklub players
People from Flekkefjord
Expatriate footballers in Estonia
Expatriate men's footballers in Denmark
Norwegian expatriate footballers
1979 births
Living people
Association football forwards
Norwegian expatriate sportspeople in Estonia
Norwegian expatriate sportspeople in Denmark
Sportspeople from Agder
Meistriliiga players